The 1956 Bolivian Primera División, the first division of Bolivian football (soccer), was played by 12 teams. The champion was Bolívar.

Torneo Integrado

Standings

External links
 Official website of the LFPB 

Bolivian Primera División seasons
Bolivia
1956 in Bolivian sport